Goichi Oie (died August 2, 1944) was a captain in the Imperial Japanese Navy during World War II, and died during the Battle of Tinian.

Biography 
Goichi Oie was the subordinate to Admiral Kakuji Kakuta, the commander of the Tinian garrison. He was responsible for the defenses of the four airfields on Tinian, as well as their anti-air weaponry and their artillery. He commanded 4,500 naval troops in total. Oie and Kiyochi Ogata, two of the Japanese commanders on the island, had their headquarters set up at Mt. Lasso, the highest point on the island. When the United States Marine Corps attacked Tinian in late 1944, he resisted them with his big guns, which inflicted severe casualties on the US troops and destroyed some of their LVTs before their troops could disembark. However, the US troops that landed broke through to Mt. Lasso, which endangered Japanese control of the island. Kakuta, Ogata, and Oie committed suicide in the traditional fashion of seppuku, where they stabbed themselves with swords and disemboweled themselves.  The knife that Goichi Oie used to commit seppuku was retrieved by a US Marine named Fred Osgood and sent home to the US in 1944.

References 

 Brooks, Victor: "Hell is Upon Us: D-Day in the Pacific, June–August 1944", 2005

1944 deaths
Japanese military personnel of World War II
Imperial Japanese Navy officers
Japanese military personnel who committed suicide
Japanese military personnel killed in World War II
1897 births